Nebria cordicollis praegensis is a subspecies of black coloured ground beetle in the Nebriinae subfamily that is endemic to Seehalde, Germany.

References

cordicollis praegensis
Beetles of Europe
Endemic fauna of Germany